George Germain, 1st Viscount Sackville, PC (26 January 1716 – 26 August 1785), styled The Honourable George Sackville until 1720, Lord George Sackville from 1720 to 1770 and Lord George Germain from 1770 to 1782, was a British soldier and politician who served as Secretary of State for the American Department in Lord North's cabinet during the American War of Independence.

His ministry received much of the blame for Britain's loss of thirteen American colonies. His issuance of detailed instructions in military matters, coupled with his failure to understand either the geography of the American colonies or the determination of their colonists, may justify that conclusion. He had two careers, a military career, in which he rose to the rank of Major-General, and a political career, in which he rose to the rank of Secretary of State for the Colonies. His military career had distinction, but ended with his court martial. Sackville served in the British Army in the War of the Austrian Succession of 1740-1748 and in the Seven Years' War of 1756–1763, including at the decisive Battle of Minden.  His political career ended with the fall of the North government in March 1782.

Background and education
Sackville was the third son of Lionel Sackville, 1st Duke of Dorset, and his wife Elizabeth, daughter of Lieutenant-General Walter Philip Colyear. His Godfather George I attended his baptism. He was educated at Westminster School in London and graduated from Trinity College in Dublin in 1737. Between 1730 and 1737 and again from 1750 to 1755, his father held the post of Lord Lieutenant of Ireland. While in Dublin he befriended the celebrated writer Jonathan Swift. He also encountered Lord Ligonier who would later assist his career in the military.

He then entered the army. Sackville was elected Grandmaster of the Grand Lodge of Ireland in 1751 and served for two years.

Family
He married Diana Sambrooke, daughter of John Sambrooke and Elizabeth Forester, on 3 September 1754. They had two sons and three daughters, including:
Diana Sackville (8 July 1756 – 29 August 1814).
Charles Sackville (27 August 1767 – 29 July 1843), later changed his name to Charles Sackville-Germain.
George Sackville (7 December 1770 – 31 May 1836)
Elizabeth, married Henry Herbert, MP

Early military career

Sackville started as a captain in the 7th Horse (later the 6th Dragoon Guards). In 1740, he transferred to the Gloucestershire Regiment of Foot as a lieutenant colonel. The regiment was sent to Germany to participate in the War of the Austrian Succession. In 1743. Sackville was advanced to brevet colonel.

Battle of Fontenoy

He saw his first battle, leading the charge of the Duke of Cumberland's infantry in the Battle of Fontenoy in 1745. He led his regiment so deep into the French lines that when he was wounded and captured he was taken to the tent of Louis XV. When he was released and returned home, it was to duty in Scotland as the Colonel of the 20th Foot Regiment.

In 1747 and 1748, he again joined the Duke of Cumberland. He became colonel of the 7th Irish horse and served in Holland. There was a break in his military career between wars (1750-1755) when he served as first secretary to his father.

During the Seven Years' War, Sackville returned to active military service. He had been considered for the post of Commander-in-Chief in North America, which eventually went to Edward Braddock, who led his force to disaster during the Braddock Campaign. In 1755, he was promoted to major general and returned to active service to oversee ordnance. In 1758, he was given a fourth regiment and joined the Duke of Marlborough as a lieutenant general. He was sworn of the Privy Council in January 1758.

Raid on St Malo

In June 1758 Sackville was second in command of a British expedition, led by Marlborough, which attempted an amphibious Raid on St Malo. While it failed to take the town as instructed, the raid was still considered to have been largely successful as a diversion. Follow-up raids were considered against Le Havre, Caen and other targets in Normandy, but no further landings were attempted, and the force returned home.

Later in 1758 they joined the allied forces of Duke Ferdinand of Brunswick in Germany, with the first detachment of British troops sent to the Continent. When Marlborough died, Sackville became Commander of the British contingent of the army, although still under the overall command of the Duke of Brunswick.

Battle of Minden

In the Battle of Minden on 1 August 1759, British and Hanoverian infantry of the centre made an advance on the French cavalry and artillery in that sector. They apparently went in without orders and their attacking line formation even repulsed repeated French cavalry charges, holding until the last moment then firing a massive volley when the charge came within ten yards. As the disrupted French began to fall back on Minden, Ferdinand called for a British cavalry charge to complete the victory, but Sackville withheld permission for their advance. Ferdinand sent his order several times, but Sackville was estranged from Lord Granby, the force commander. He continued to withhold permission for Granby to "gain glory" through an attack. For that action, he was cashiered and sent home. Granby replaced him as commander of the British contingent for the remainder of the war.

Court martial
Sackville refused to accept responsibility for refusing to obey orders. Back in England, he demanded a court martial, and made it a large enough issue that he obtained his demand in 1760. The court found him guilty, and imposed one of the strangest and strongest verdicts ever rendered against a general officer. The court's verdict not only upheld his discharge but also ruled that he was "unfit to serve His Majesty in any military Capacity whatever", then ordered that their verdict be read to and entered in the orderly book of every regiment in the army. The king had his name struck from the Privy Council rolls.

Early political career

Sackville had been a Member of Parliament at intervals since 1733. He had served terms in both the Dublin and the Westminster bodies, sometimes simultaneously, but had not taken sides in political wrangles.

Between 1750 and 1755 he served as Chief Secretary for Ireland, during his father's second term as Lord Lieutenant of Ireland.

When George III took the throne in 1760, Sackville began his political rehabilitation. There did not seem to be negative repercussions to the European stalemate of the Seven Years' War. The victories over the French within the colonial empire provided a chance for events of the war to be forgotten. The difficulty of repaying the debts incurred to fight the war caused a period of unstable ministries and shifting political alliances. In 1765, King George quietly returned him to the rolls of the Privy Council.

Initially he was a follower of George Grenville's faction, but he increasingly lined up as a supporter of Lord North and, in 1769, he made the alliance formal. Then, in 1769, Lady Elizabeth Germain died without natural heirs, and left her estates, including Drayton, Northamptonshire, to him. That not only improved his finances but also gave him the chance to take that name formally. After 1770, he was known as Lord George Germain.

Secretary of State

Appointment
On 10 November 1775, Germain was appointed Secretary of State for the American Department replacing Lord Dartmouth in the post. At that time, North's cabinet had three secretaries of state; one each for Europe (the Northern Department), America, and the rest of the world (the Southern Department). Besides international relations, the secretaries were responsible for a great deal of Colonial administration and for military operations within their area. That made Germain the primary minister responsible for suppressing the rebellion that had broken out in 1775 in the colonies. He promoted or relieved Generals, took care of provisions and supplies, and became involved with the strategic planning of the war.

American War of Independence

Sackville and Lord North made three assumptions about the war they were about to face: firstly, the American forces could not withstand the assaults of the British; secondly, the war would be similar to wars they had fought successfully in Europe; and lastly, their victory would bring about their goal of having the colonies' allegiance. All of their assumptions proved to be false, with the limited and unhelpful exception of the first, in that the American forces usually could not withstand the assaults of the British in open battle but instead adopted other, more successful, tactics.

In 1776 he worked with General Burgoyne to plan, support and issue orders for the Saratoga campaign. However, his unclear orders to General Howe contributed to the campaign's failure. Following the entry of France, Spain and the Dutch Republic into the conflict, British emphasis shifted to focus increasingly on a global war. British troops were withdrawn from Philadelphia and reinforcements were sent to the valuable sugar-producing West Indies. In 1779 one of Germain's associates, Richard Cumberland was sent to Madrid for failed talks, designed to reach a separate peace settlement with Spain.

Yorktown

In 1781, the confusion involving orders sent to Cornwallis from Clinton contributed to the loss at Yorktown.
The news of Yorktown reached London on 25 November 1781 and the messenger went first to Germain's residence at Pall Mall. Germain then went to tell other ministers. Together they went to Lord North who reportedly cried out "Oh God - It's all over". It was agreed that Germain, rather than North, should take the news to the King who was at Kew. The King's Speech two days later had to be re-written in light of Yorktown. News of the surrender galvanised the Opposition and government majorities began to shrink over the following months with calls for resignations of senior ministers. Germain drew up a plan to continue the war using the existing British bases in Charleston, New York, Savannah and Canada to harass the American coastline and frontiers. He also advocated re-occupying Newport in Rhode Island to give a foothold in New England.

Departure from office
Germain became a target for the opposition, and was eventually persuaded to step down in exchange for a peerage, and in February 1782 he was made Baron Bolebrooke, in the County of Sussex, and Viscount Sackville, of Drayton in the County of Northampton. That was considered essential if the North government was to survive by bringing in factions of the opposition to which Germain was personally objectionable. He was replaced by Welbore Ellis. In spite of Germain's departure, the North government fell shortly afterwards in February 1782 and was followed by a period of political instability. Shortly after the fall of the North government, news arrived of the decisive British naval victory at the Battle of the Saintes in the Caribbean, which would have boosted the government had it still been in power. The Shelburne government agreed to the Peace of Paris, bringing an end to the war in 1783 and recognising the independence of the United States.

Later life

The controversy over Lord Sackville's handling of the war continued. Some members were opposed to his taking a seat in the House of Lords, an almost unprecedented incident. However, he was admitted to the Lords, where he was staunchly defended by Lord Thurlow, and his declining health soon made the issue irrelevant. He retired to his country home at Stoneland Lodge and died there in 1785. He maintained to his dying day that he had not been a coward at Minden. Following his death, a defence of Sackville's reputation, The character of the late Viscount Sackville, was written by Richard Cumberland. A trove of the subject's letters were published by the Historical Records Commission beginning in 1904 under the title Report on the manuscripts of Mrs. Stopford-Sackville, of Drayton House, Northhamptonshire / with a new introduction and preface by George Athan Billias.

The Drayton House estate passed to his son Charles, who later became the 5th (and last) Duke of Dorset. The Stoneland estate (or Buckhurst Park as it came to be known) passed via the wife of the late 3rd Duke of Dorset to her daughter Countess de la Warr on the Dowager Duchess's death in 1825.

Legacy 
 Namesake of Fort Sackville (Nova Scotia), Canada
 Lower Sackville, Nova Scotia and Upper Sackville, Nova Scotia
 Germain Street, Saint John, New Brunswick
 Sackville, New South Wales
 Town of Sackville, New Brunswick.  Established in 1762 by settlers ("New England planters") from Rhode Island and southern Massachusetts, the Sackville Township, named for Viscount Sackville, was formally created in 1765; by 1772 it was sufficiently populated to send a representative to the Nova Scotia House of Assembly. (Wikipedia) It became part of the Province of New Brunswick in 1784. The Town was incorporated in 1903.

References

Further reading

 Brown, Gerald S. "The Court Martial of Lord George Sackville, Whipping Boy of the Revolutionary War." William and Mary Quarterly (1952): 317-337 online.
 
 Clark, Jane. "Responsibility for the Failure of the Burgoyne Campaign." American Historical Review (1930): 542-559 online.
 Guttridge, George H. "Lord George Germain in Office, 1775-1782." American Historical Review 33.1 (1927): 23–43. online
 Gruber, Ira D. "Lord Howe and Lord George Germain, British Politics and the Winning of American Independence." William and Mary Quarterly (1965): 225–243. in JSTOR
 Jones, Robert W. "9 "Unfit to Serve": Honour, Masculinity, and the Fate of Lord George Sackville." in The Culture of the Seven Years' War: Empire, Identity, and the Arts in the Eighteenth-Century Atlantic World (2014): 213+ online
 Kyte, George W. "Plans for Reconquest of the Rebellious Colonies in America." Historian 10.2 (1948): 101–117.
 Mackesy, Piers. Coward of Minden: The Affair of Lord George Sackville (1979).
 Nelson, Paul David. "British Conduct of the American Revolutionary War: A Review of Interpretations." Journal of American History 65.3 (1978): 623–653. online
 O'Shaughnessy, Andrew Jackson. The Men who Lost America: British Leadership, the American Revolution, and the Fate of the Empire (Yale UP, 2014). 
 Robson, Eric. "Lord George Germain and the American Colonies." History Today (Feb 1953) 3#2 pp 115–121.
 Valentine, Alan,  Lord George Germain  (1962), full biography that casts heavy blame on him for all British failures; reviews call it an unreliable book; online review
 Weddle, Kevin J. "A Change of Both Men and Measures": British Reassessment of Military Strategy after Saratoga, 1777–1778." Journal of Military History 77.3 (2013).
 Willcox, William B. "British Strategy in America, 1778." Journal of Modern History (1947): 97–121. in JSTOR

|-

1716 births
1785 deaths
12th Royal Lancers officers
2nd Dragoon Guards (Queen's Bays) officers
British Army generals
British Army personnel of the Jacobite rising of 1745
British Army personnel of the War of the Austrian Succession
British Army personnel who were court-martialled
British MPs 1761–1768
British MPs 1768–1774
British MPs 1774–1780
British MPs 1780–1784
British officials in the American Revolution
Carabiniers (6th Dragoon Guards) officers
Irish MPs 1727–1760
Lancashire Fusiliers officers
Members of the Parliament of Ireland (pre-1801) for County Kilkenny constituencies
Germain, George|Germain, George
Members of the Privy Council of Great Britain
Members of the Privy Council of Ireland
People educated at Westminster School, London
People expelled from the Privy Council of Great Britain
Viscounts in the Peerage of Great Britain
Peers of Great Britain created by George III
Younger sons of dukes
George
Chief Secretaries for Ireland
Secretaries of State for the Colonies
Presidents of the Board of Trade
British people of the American Revolution
Alumni of Trinity College Dublin
British duellists